Gheorghe Ştefănescu (1929 – 14 December 1981) was a Romanian businessman at the centre of one of the largest corruption scandals during the Communist period, in the wine industry.

The administrator of a Bucharest liquor store on Calea Griviţei, near the Basarab Bridge, from 1971 to 1978 he headed a network that profited from the alteration of wine. At Cotești vineyards, the director would claim poor production due to "natural disasters", thus leaving a secret surplus. These undeclared wines were then mixed (high quality with low quality), and the brew was sold at inflated prices, with the difference pocketed by Ştefănescu (nicknamed "Bachus") and his men. In seven years, over 400,000 litres of wine received without documentation were altered. They also mixed yeast rakia with plum ţuică, but kept the same concentration of alcohol.

Ştefănescu was caught by chance in 1978. A Securitate lieutenant purchased wine for his own wedding, which was then delayed. Several weeks later, the officer sampled the wine and noticed that only a watery solution with reddish dregs remained. Over 250 militia agents and prosecutors were assigned to the case, and investigators searching Ştefănescu's house found over 18 kg of gold jewellery (worth some $360,000) and between 2.2 and 40 million lei in cash and checks. He also had an apartment in Bucharest, a villa at Breaza and two Lada cars. In addition to wine stores all over Bucharest, Bachus' network included everyone from office bosses to party first secretaries and directors of government ministries, whom he gave money, jewellery and other bribes to have them look the other way or provide him with the required additives. Over 200 were sent to prison.

Ştefănescu was tried and sentenced to death in April 1980, being shot at Jilava the following year and leaving a wife and son. Selling fraudulent wine  (a "crime against the socialist order") earned him the death penalty; for his other crimes, treated in nine dossiers, he received only prison terms. Legend has it that, brought before dictator Nicolae Ceauşescu, who asked him what he wished to do with all his money, Ştefănescu replied, "I wanted to overthrow the regime!" An unofficial estimate of the amount of money he cost the Romanian state puts it at $4.5 million, in 1970s dollars.

In 1984, a film called Secretul lui Bachus ("Bachus' Secret") was released based on the case, directed by Geo Saizescu and starring Ştefan Mihăilescu-Brăila.

Notes

External links
 Edward Pastia, "Cele mai mari tunuri din istoria Romaniei" ("The Greatest Swindles in Romanian History"), Financiarul, 27 March 2008
 Mihnea Mihalache Fiastru, Razvan Bică, "Românii sunt nostalgici după vinul lui Ştefănescu, zis 'Bachus'" ("Romanians are Nostalgic for the Wine of Ştefănescu, Nicknamed 'Bachus'", Cancan, 19 December 2007

1929 births
1981 deaths
20th-century Romanian businesspeople
Romanian criminals
People executed by Romania by firing squad
Executed Romanian people
People executed by the Socialist Republic of Romania
Date of birth missing
Place of birth missing
People executed for corruption